Moraglia is a surname. Notable people with this surname include:

 Francesco Moraglia (born 1953), Italian Roman Catholic Archbishop and current Patriarch of Venice
 Giacomo Moraglia (1791-1860),  prolific Italian architect in the late Neoclassical period

See also 
 Mori

it:Moraglia